Mount Emlyn is a rural locality in the Toowoomba Region, Queensland, Australia. In the  Mount Emlyn had a population of 16 people.

Geography 

History 
The locality is named after the mountain, which was originally known as Mount Allys, which was the family name of Lord Cawdor of the British House of Peers. It was renamed Mount Emlyn in the late 1800s, after the second wife of Francis Arthur Gore, grazier of Yandilla Station.

Mount Emlyn Provisional School opened on 10 May 1920. In 1948 it became Mount Emylyn State School. It closed on 21 April 1957.

In the  Mount Emlyn had a population of 16 people.

References 

Toowoomba Region
Localities in Queensland